The compounds of ten octahedra UC15 and UC16 are two uniform polyhedron compounds. They are composed of a symmetric arrangement of 10 octahedra, considered as triangular antiprisms, aligned with the axes of three-fold rotational symmetry of an icosahedron. The two compounds differ in the orientation of their octahedra: each compound may be transformed into the other by rotating each octahedron by 60 degrees.

Cartesian coordinates 
Cartesian coordinates for the vertices of this compound are all the cyclic permutations of

 (0, ±(τ−1 + 2sτ), ±(τ − 2sτ−1))
 (±( − sτ2), ±( + s(2τ − 1)), ±( + sτ−2))
 (±(τ−1 − sτ), ±(τ + sτ−1), ±3s)

where τ = (1 + )/2 is the golden ratio (sometimes written φ) and s is either +1 or −1. Setting s = −1 gives UC15, while s = +1 gives UC16.

See also
Compound of three octahedra
Compound of four octahedra
Compound of five octahedra
Compound of twenty octahedra

References 
.

Polyhedral compounds